West Boothbay Harbor is an unincorporated village in the town of Boothbay Harbor, Lincoln County, Maine, United States. West Boothbay Harbor has a post office with ZIP code 04575.

References

Villages in Lincoln County, Maine
Villages in Maine